Kristanna Loken (born October 8, 1979) is an American actress and model. She is known for her roles in the films Terminator 3: Rise of the Machines (2003), BloodRayne (2005) and Bounty Killer (2013) and on the TV series Painkiller Jane (2007), The L Word (2007–2008) and Burn Notice (2011–2012).

Early life
Loken was born October 8, 1979, with some sources giving her place of birth as Ghent, New York, and others stating that she was born in a Norwegian community in Wisconsin. She is the daughter of two full-blooded Norwegian parents: Rande (née Porath), a model, and Merlin "Chris" Loken, a writer, apple farmer, and former Broadway and Hollywood actor. Loken is of Norwegian descent from her great-grandparents, and her grandparents also spoke Norwegian. Regarding her ethnic heritage, Loken indicated in a 2003 interview that she calls herself both Norwegian and American, saying, "We follow many of the Norwegian traditions...the holidays, especially at Christmas. This is something I hope to keep going when I have a family of my own." In a 2006 interview she also mentioned German heritage, stating, "I do have Norwegian blood, with a little bit of German in there." She grew up in a town in Upstate New York, and took her first trip to Norway at age 12.

Career
Loken's mother encouraged her to become a model. She participated at the 1994 Elite Model Look, placing third runner-up. Loken started her acting career in 1994 as the third actress to play Danielle 'Dani' Andropoulos on an episode of As the World Turns. She later appeared in several television shows and films, including regular appearances on the television shows Philly, Unhappily Ever After and Boy Meets World.

In 1998, Loken starred in Mortal Kombat: Conquest as Taja. She played the gynoid T-X (Terminatrix) in the 2003 movie Terminator 3: Rise of the Machines. In 2004, she appeared in a German television movie, Die Nibelungen (also known as "Dark Kingdom: The Dragon King" or "Sword of Xanten"), which aired as a two-part miniseries and set a ratings record. She starred as the leading character in the 2006 film adaptation of the video game BloodRayne, and appeared in director Uwe Boll's film adaptation of the video game Dungeon Siege, called In the Name of the King.

She appeared in 10 episodes of the fourth season of The L Word, which debuted in January 2007. Additionally, she starred as the title character in the Sci-Fi Channel's series Painkiller Jane which aired from April to September 2007. In December 2011, Loken appeared in the fifth-season finale of the USA Network TV series Burn Notice as CIA agent Rebecca Lang, and would reprise that role in three sixth-season episodes during mid-2012.

In 2014, she starred in the action movie Mercenaries, alongside Cynthia Rothrock, Brigitte Nielsen, Vivica A. Fox, Zoë Bell and Nicole Bilderback.

In 2017, she co-starred in the romantic thriller film Body of Deceit, alongside Sarai Givaty.

Personal life
Loken has a sister named Tanya.

She stated in an interview with Curve magazine: "I have dated and have had sex with men and women and have to say that the relationships I have had with certain women have been much more fulfilling, sexually and emotionally, than of those with certain men. I connect with an aura, with energy. And if the person with whom I connect happens to be a female, that's just the way it is. That's what makes my wheels turn."

On January 17, 2008, Loken announced on her website she was engaged to her Painkiller Jane co-star Noah Danby; the couple exchanged marriage vows at her family's farm on May 10, 2008. In an interview published on November 16, 2009, she announced she had separated from Danby and was dating a woman.

Loken gave birth to a son, Thor, in May 2016.

Filmography

Film

Television

Video games

Awards and nominations

References

External links

 
 

Living people
1979 births
American people of Scandinavian descent
20th-century American actresses
21st-century American actresses
Actresses from New York (state)
American child actresses
American female models
American film actresses
Film producers from New York (state)
American people of German descent
American people of Norwegian descent
American soap opera actresses
American television actresses
American video game actresses
Bisexual actresses
LGBT models
LGBT people from New York (state)
LGBT producers
People from Ghent, New York
American women film producers
American bisexual actors